The following is the list of Mystery! episodes in order by season.

In 1980, Mystery! was launched as the de facto spin-off of Masterpiece Theatre and ran until 2007. For most of its history, the program aired on Thursday nights. Beginning in season 22, the time slot shifted to Wednesday, and then Monday. Finally, in late 2002, Mystery! was moved to Sunday nights and shared the same time slot as Masterpiece Theatre. For the next five years, Mystery! aired as a summer and early fall program, while Masterpiece Theatre aired in the late fall, winter, and spring.

In early 2008, Mystery! and Masterpiece Theatre were reformatted as Masterpiece.  Masterpiece is aired as three different series: Masterpiece Classic, Masterpiece Mystery!, and Masterpiece Contemporary.

This lists the titles of the individual miniseries. Some ran for only one episode, many ran for two or more installments. The following lists them according to original season, and then in alphabetical order.  Also included are the original UK series and episode numbers for each program, when they differ from the US numbers.  For lists of episodes of the successor series, see List of Masterpiece Mystery! episodes.

This list does not include any rebroadcasts of series, including those previously shown on Masterpiece Theatre.

Episode list

Season 1 (1980-81)

The Racing Game, Series I
Rebecca
Rumpole of the Bailey, Series I (UK Series I: 3-6)
Sergeant Cribb, Series I (UK Series I:2,3,6)
She Fell Among Thieves

Season 2 (1981-82)

Dr. Jekyll and Mr. Hyde
Malice Aforethought
The Racing Game, Series II
Rumpole of the Bailey, Series II
Sergeant Cribb, Series II (UK Series I:1,4,5,7,8)

Season 3 (1982-83)

Agatha Christie Stories, Series I
Dying Day
Father Brown, Series I
The Limbo Connection
Melissa
Miss Morison's Ghosts
Quiet as a Nun
Sergeant Cribb, Series III (UK Series II:1,2,4,5,6)
Sweeney Todd
We, the Accused

Season 4 (1983-84)

Reilly, Ace of Spies, Series I
Shades of Darkness, Series I

Season 5 (1984-85)

The Adventures of Sherlock Holmes, Series I
Agatha Christie Stories, Series II
Agatha Christie's Partners in Crime, Series I (UK Series I:2-6)
Praying Mantis
Rumpole of the Bailey, Series III
The Woman in White

Season 6 (1985-86)

The Adventures of Sherlock Holmes, Series II
Agatha Christie's Miss Marple, Series I (UK Series I:1-2)
Agatha Christie's Partners in Crime, Series II (UK Series I:7-11)
Charters and Caldicott
Dalgliesh I: Death of an Expert Witness
My Cousin Rachel

Season 7 (1986-87)

Agatha Christie's Miss Marple, Series II (UK Series I:3-4)
Agatha Christie's The Secret Adversary
Brat Farrar
Dalgliesh II: Shroud for a Nightingale
Dalgliesh III: Cover Her Face
The Return of Sherlock Holmes, Series I

Season 8 (1987-88)

Agatha Christie's Miss Marple, Series III (UK Series I:6-8)
Dalgliesh IV: The Black Tower
Inspector Morse, Series I
Lord Peter Wimsey, Series I
Rumpole of the Bailey, Series IV

Season 9 (1988-89)

Agatha Christie's Miss Marple, Series IV (UK Series I:5,9)
Cause Célèbre
Game, Set and Match
Inspector Morse, Series II (UK Series II:1,2,4)
The Return of Sherlock Holmes, Series II

Season 10 (1989-1990)

Agatha Christie's Poirot, Series I
Campion, Series I
Dalgliesh V: A Taste for Death
Inspector Morse, Series III (UK Series II:3 and Series III:1-2)
Rumpole of the Bailey, Series V

Season 11 (1990-91)

Agatha Christie's Poirot, Series II (UK Series II:1-7 and Series III:1)
Campion, Series II
The Dark Angel
Die Kinder (The Children)
Inspector Morse, Series IV (UK Series III:3-4 and Series IV:1)
The Man from the Pru
Mother Love

Season 12 (1991-92)

Agatha Christie's Poirot, Series III (UK Series II:8-9 and Series III:2-7)
The Casebook of Sherlock Holmes, Series I
Dalgliesh VI: Devices and Desires
The Inspector Alleyn Mysteries: Artists in Crime (UK Pilot)
Inspector Morse, Series V (UK Series IV:2-4)
Prime Suspect I

Season 13 (1992-93)

Agatha Christie's Poirot, Series IV (UK Series III:8-11 and Series IV:1)
Inspector Morse, Series VI (UK Series V: 1,2,5)
Maigret, Series I
Prime Suspect II
Rumpole of the Bailey, Series VI
Sherlock Holmes: The Master Blackmailer

Season 14 (1993-94)

Agatha Christie's Poirot, Series V (UK Series IV:2-3 and Series V:1,5,7,8)
Dalgliesh VII: Unnatural Causes
The Inspector Alleyn Mysteries, Series I (UK Series I:1-3)
Inspector Morse, Series VII (UK Series V:3-4 and Series VI:1-2)
Prime Suspect III
Sherlock Holmes: The Eligible Bachelor
Sherlock Holmes: The Last Vampire

Season 15 (1994-95)

Agatha Christie's Poirot, Series VI (UK Series V:2-4,6)
Cadfael, Series I
A Dark Adapted Eye
The Inspector Alleyn Mysteries, Series II (UK Series I:4-5)
Inspector Morse, Series VIII (UK Series VI:3-5)
Maigret, Series II
Rumpole of the Bailey, Series VII

Season 16 (1995-96)

Agatha Christie's Poirot, Series VII (UK Series VI:2)
Chandler & Company
Dalgliesh VIII: A Mind to Murder
Gallowglass
Inspector Morse, Series IX (UK Series VII:2-3)
The Memoirs of Sherlock Holmes, Series I

Season 17 (1996-97)

Agatha Christie's Poirot, Series VIII (UK Series VI:1,4)
Cadfael, Series II
Dalgliesh IX: Original Sin
Inspector Morse, Series X (UK Series VII:1 and 1995 Special)
Oliver's Travels

Season 18 (1997-98)

Deep Secrets
Hetty Wainthropp Investigates, Series I (UK Series I:1,2,4,6)
Into the Blue
The Sculptress

Season 19 (1998-99)

Cadfael, Series III
Cadfael, Series IV
Dalgliesh X: A Certain Justice
Heat of the Sun, Series I
Hetty Wainthropp Investigates, Series II (UK Series II:1,4-6)
Inspector Morse, Series XI (UK 1996 and 1997 Specials)
The Life and Crimes of William Palmer
Touching Evil, Series I

Season 20 (1999-2000)

Hetty Wainthropp Investigates, Series III (UK Series III:1-6)
Inspector Morse, Series XII (UK 1998 Special)
Lady Audley's Secret
Murder Rooms: The Dark Beginnings of Sherlock Holmes (UK Pilot)
Second Sight, Series I
Touching Evil, Series II
An Unsuitable Job for a Woman

Season 21 (2000-01)

Hetty Wainthropp Investigates, Series IV (UK Series III:7-9 and Series IV:1-3)
The Inspector Morse Finalé: The Remorseful Day (UK 2000 Special)
The Last Morse: A Documentary 
The Mrs. Bradley Mysteries, (UK Pilot)
Second Sight, Series II
Touching Evil, Series III
Trial by Fire
The Wyvern Mystery

Season 22 (2002)

Forgotten
The Inspector Lynley Mysteries I: A Great Deliverance (UK Pilot)
Murder Rooms: The Dark Beginnings of Sherlock Holmes, Series I
Skinwalkers: An American MYSTERY! Special

Season 23 (2003)

Coyote Waits: An American MYSTERY! Special
Dead Gorgeous
Hetty Wainthropp Investigates, Series V (UK Series IV:4-6)
The Inspector Lynley Mysteries, Series II (UK Series I)
The Mrs. Bradley Mysteries, Series I

Season 24 (2004)

Dalgliesh XI: Death in Holy Orders
Foyle's War, Series II
The Inspector Lynley Mysteries, Series III (UK Series II)
A Thief of Time: An American MYSTERY! Special

Season 25 (2005)

Agatha Christie's Marple, Series I
Dalgliesh XII: The Murder Room
Foyle's War, Series III
The Inspector Lynley Mysteries, Series IV (UK Series III)
Malice Aforethought

Season 26 (2006)

Agatha Christie's Marple, Series II
Inspector Lewis (UK Pilot)
The Inspector Lynley Mysteries, Series V (UK Series IV)
Jericho, Series I

Final Season 27 (2007)

Agatha Christie's Marple, Series III
Foyle's War, Series IV
Inspector Lynley Mysteries, Series VI (UK Series V)
Jericho, Series II

Lists of American drama television series episodes
Lists of anthology television series episodes